Kv channel-interacting protein 4 is a protein that in humans is encoded by the KCNIP4 gene.

This gene encodes a member of the family of voltage-gated potassium (Kv) channel-interacting proteins (KCNIPs), which belong to the recoverin branch of the EF-hand superfamily. Members of the KCNIP family are small calcium binding proteins. They all have EF-hand-like domains, and differ from each other in the N-terminus. They are integral subunit components of native Kv4 channel complexes. They may regulate A-type currents, and hence neuronal excitability, in response to changes in intracellular calcium. This protein member also interacts with presenilin. Multiple alternatively spliced transcript variants encoding distinct isoforms have been identified for this gene.

Interactions
KCNIP4 has been shown to interact with PSEN2.

See also
 Voltage-gated potassium channel

References

Further reading

External links 
 

Ion channels
EF-hand-containing proteins